Phu Ruea National Park is a national park in Loei Province, Thailand. The park is centred on Phu Ruea mountain, a popular, scenic peak in the Phetchabun Mountains. The park was established on 26 July 1979.

Geography 

The park's area is 75,525 rai ~ .

In December and January temperatures here can fall below freezing. Phu Ruea means 'boat mountain', a name inspired by the shape of a cliff at the peak.

The peak of Phu Ruea offers views of the Mekong and Hueang Rivers and Laos. Pha Sam Thong is a large cliff.

Flora and fauna 
Types of forest in the park include mixed deciduous, deciduous dipterocarp, dry evergreen, and coniferous. Plant species include orchids such as Phalaenopsis pulcherrima, Rhynchostylis retusa and various Vanda and Dendrobium species as well as various rhododendron such as Rhododendron simsii and Rhododendron lyi.

Animal species include sun bear, northern red muntjac, sambar deer, dhole, black giant squirrel and Siamese hare. Bird life in the park includes red junglefowl, Siamese fireback, yellow-vented bulbul, greater coucal, plain prinia, coppersmith barbet, Asian barred owlet as well as brown-throated sunbird. The endangered big-headed turtle is present in the park.

See also
List of national parks of Thailand
List of Protected Areas Regional Offices of Thailand

References 

National parks of Thailand
Geography of Loei province
Tourist attractions in Loei province
Phetchabun Mountains